Ted Graham may refer to:
*Ted Graham (ice hockey) (1904–1979), Canadian ice hockey defenceman
Ted Graham, Baron Graham of Edmonton (1925–2020), British Labour Co-operative politician

See also
Edward Graham (disambiguation)